Terrell Anthony Watson (born August 22, 1993) is a former American football running back. He played college football at Azusa Pacific. He was signed by the Cincinnati Bengals as an undrafted free agent in 2015.

Watson has also been a member of the Cleveland Browns, Denver Broncos, Philadelphia Eagles, Pittsburgh Steelers, New York Giants, Los Angeles Chargers, and San Diego Fleet.

Early years 
Watson was born in Los Angeles, California on August 22, 1993 and was raised by his maternal grandparents Billy and Janice Watson after his mother abandoned him. Watson's mother was 15 years old at the time.

Watson went on to star in football at Oxnard High School in Oxnard, California.

In 2016, Watson began to open up about his background, talking about his speech impediment, and bullying that occurring due to his lisp. He talked with a lisp, inability to read and it was difficult for him to understand simple concepts in elementary school which caused him to be bullied, teased and looked down upon by fellow pupils. However, Watson overcame his early life struggles moving from remedial-level or special education classes to normal classes by late Middle school which he credits to his teachers who helped him. Due to his educational background. he did not receive any scholarship offers coming out of high school. Which led him to Azusa Pacific.

College career 
During his college career, Watson scored 79 touchdowns and rushed for nearly 6,000 yards for Azusa Pacific. He broke every rushing record at the school, which were previously held by NFL player Christian Okoye. Watson ran for 2,212 yards and 29 touchdowns as a senior in the 2014 season. He went on to be named MVP of the January 2015 edition of the NFLPA Collegiate Bowl.

Professional career 
After completing his senior season, Watson declared for the NFL draft and received an invitation to the NFLPA Collegiate Bowl. On January 17, 2015, Watson had nine carries for 55 yards and a touchdown as the National team won the NFLPA Collegiate Bowl and defeated the American team 17-0. Watson and the National team were coached by former St. Louis Rams' head coach Mike Martz as Watson won the NFLPA Collegiate Bowl MVP award for his performance. Watson was not among the 35 collegiate running backs who received an invitation to the NFL Combine. On March 9, 2015, Watson participated at Azusa Pacific's pro day, along with five other teammates. He performed positional and combine drills for team representatives and scouts from 15 NFL teams. Running backs coaches from the Houston Texans, Cincinnati Bengals, and Arizona Cardinals attended Azusa’s pro day, with the Texans' coach primarily running his workout. Watson attended a pre-draft visit with the Bengals and received the most interest from them. At the conclusion of the pre-draft process, Watson was projected to be a seventh round pick or priority undrafted free agent by NFL draft experts and scouts. He was ranked as the 25th best running back in the draft by NFLDraftScout.com.

Cincinnati Bengals 
On May 2, 2015, the Cincinnati Bengals signed Watson to a three-year, $1.58 million contract after he went undrafted in the 2015 NFL Draft. Throughout training camp, Watson competed for a roster spot against BenJarvus Green-Ellis, Rex Burkhead,
Cedric Peerman, and James Wilder Jr. On September 5, 2015, the Bengals waived Watson and signed him to their practice squad the following day, where he spent the entire  season.

Cleveland Browns 
On January 21, 2016, the Cleveland Browns signed Watson to a reserve/futures contract.

Throughout training camp, he competed for a roster spot against Glenn Winston, Raheem Mostert, Rajion Neal, and Jahwan Edwards. On September 4, 2016, he was waived by the Browns a day after making the initial 53-man roster and was signed to the practice squad the next day. He was released by the Browns on October 26, 2016.

Denver Broncos
On November 2, 2016, Watson was signed to the Denver Broncos' practice squad. He was released by the Broncos on December 14, 2016.

Philadelphia Eagles
On December 20, 2016, Watson was signed to the Philadelphia Eagles' practice squad. He was promoted to the active roster on December 30, 2016. He scored his first career touchdown on a one-yard run on January 1, 2017 in his NFL debut against the Dallas Cowboys. He totaled nine carries for 28 yards in the 27–13 victory. On May 4, 2017, he was released by the Eagles.

Pittsburgh Steelers
On May 18, 2017, Watson signed with the Pittsburgh Steelers. Watson agreed to a one-year, $465,000 contract.

Throughout training camp, Watson competed for a roster spot against Fitzgerald Toussaint, Knile Davis, and Trey Williams. He finished the 2017 preseason with 37 carries for 173 yards and one touchdown, as well as six receptions for 47 receiving yards. Head coach Mike Tomlin named Watson the third running back on the depth chart behind Le'Veon Bell and James Conner. He was assigned as the short yardage and third down back.

Watson made his regular season debut in the Steelers season-opening 21-18 victory over the Cleveland Browns. The following week, Watson had his first carry of the year for a one-yard gain during a 26–9 victory over the Minnesota Vikings. On November 25, 2017, the Steelers released Watson and was re-signed to the practice squad three days later. Overall, he had five carries for eight rushing yards to go along with seven kick returns for 140 net yards in the 2017 season.

New York Giants
On January 24, 2018, Watson signed a reserve/future contract with the New York Giants. He was waived by the Giants on May 7, 2018.

Los Angeles Chargers
On August 22, 2018, Watson was signed by the Los Angeles Chargers. He was waived on September 1, 2018.

San Diego Fleet
On September 28, 2018, Watson was signed by the San Diego Fleet. The league ceased operations in April 2019.

References

External links
Azusa Pacific Cougars bio

1993 births
Living people
American football running backs
Azusa Pacific Cougars football players
Cincinnati Bengals players
Cleveland Browns players
Denver Broncos players
Los Angeles Chargers players
Philadelphia Eagles players
Pittsburgh Steelers players
Players of American football from Los Angeles
New York Giants players
San Diego Fleet players
Sportspeople from Oxnard, California